This is the complete list of Pan American Games medalists in the canoeing program, which includes kayaking, from 1987 to 2015.

Men's events

C-1 200 metres

C-1 500 metres

C-2 500 metres

C-1 1000 metres

C-2 1000 metres

C-2 500 metres

K-1 200 metres

K-1 500 metres

K-2 500 metres

K-1 1000 metres

K-2 200 metres

K-2 1000 metres

K-4 500 metres

K-4 1000 metres

C-1 Slalom

C-2 Slalom

K-1 Slalom

K-1 Extreme Slalom

Women's events

C-1 200 metres

C-2 500 metres

K-1 200 metres

K-1 500 metres

K-2 500 metres

K-4 500 metres

C-1 Slalom

K-1 Slalom

K-1 Extreme Slalom

References

Canoeing